Mount Emily (Tolowa: en-may ) is a mountain in the Klamath Mountains of southwestern Oregon in the United States.

Wheeler Ridge Japanese Bombing Site

On September 9, 1942, the Japanese submarine I-25 surfaced near Cape Blanco, Oregon, and launched a Yokosuka E14Y "Glen" seaplane piloted by Nubuo Fujita, who dropped incendiary bombs on Mount Emily in an unsuccessful attempt to start a major forest fire. This made Mount Emily the second place in the continental United States to be bombed by an enemy aircraft, with Dutch Harbor occurring three months earlier in Unalaska, Alaska. The site of the bombing was listed in the National Register of Historic Places as the Wheeler Ridge Japanese Bombing Site in July 2006.

See also 
 American Theater (World War II)

References

External links 
 

Emily
Natural features on the National Register of Historic Places in Oregon
Rogue River-Siskiyou National Forest
Emily
World War II on the National Register of Historic Places